Nyctopais jordani is a species of beetle in the family Cerambycidae. It was described by Per Olof Christopher Aurivillius in 1913. It is known from Uganda and the Democratic Republic of the Congo.

Varietas
 Nyctopais jordani var. nigrescens Breuning, 1934
 Nyctopais jordani var. macularis Aurivillius, 1914

References

Tragocephalini
Beetles described in 1913